Nobody's Perfect is a 2004 American short film directed, produced, written and starred by Hank Azaria.

External links
 

2004 films
2004 short films
American comedy short films
2000s English-language films